A toy program is a small computer program typically used for educational purposes. Toy programs are generally of little practical use, although the concepts implemented may be useful in a much more sophisticated program.

A toy program typically focuses on a specific problem, such as computing the Nth term in a sequence, finding the roots of a quadratic equation and testing if a number is prime.

Toy programs  are also used for a developer trying out a new programming language, to test all of the language's syntax and coding methods.

References

Computer programming